Dennis Kay Aust (born November 25, 1940) is an American former Major League Baseball pitcher.

A native of Tecumseh, Nebraska, Aust graduated from George D. Chamberlain High School in Tampa and attended the University of Florida. He was signed by the Cardinals in 1961 and spent five full years their farm system before a stellar 1965 season in the Double-A Texas League and Triple-A International League earned him a call-up to St. Louis.

In his 15 MLB relief appearances, Aust posted a 0–1 won–lost record and a 5.82 earned run average, with two saves. In 17 career innings pitched, he surrendered 18 hits and eight bases on balls with 14 strikeouts.

Aust's only decision came on the Cardinals' opening day in 1966 when he pitched three innings in relief of Joe Hoerner. After getting the first two batters out in the top of the 12th inning, he surrendered a hit to Dick Allen followed by an intentional walk to Bill White. Pinch-hitter John Herrnstein's RBI single scored Allen, leading to the Philadelphia Phillies' 3–2 victory.

Aust's professional baseball career concluded in 1968.

See also 

 List of Florida Gators baseball players

References

External links 

1940 births
Living people
Albuquerque Dodgers players
Atlanta Crackers players
Baseball players from Nebraska
Billings Mustangs players
Charleston Marlins players
Florida Gators baseball players
Jacksonville Suns players
Johnson City Cardinals players
Knoxville Smokies players
Major League Baseball pitchers
People from Tecumseh, Nebraska
Portsmouth-Norfolk Tides players
St. Louis Cardinals players
San Juan Marlins players
Baseball players from Tampa, Florida
Tulsa Oilers (baseball) players